Chavagne (Gallo: Chavayn) is a commune in the Ille-et-Vilaine department of Brittany in northwestern France.

Geography
The river Meu forms all of the commune's southern border, then flows into the Vilaine, which forms all of its eastern border.

Population
Inhabitants of Chavagne are called Chavagnais and Chavagnaises in French.

See also
Communes of the Ille-et-Vilaine department

References

External links

Official website 

Mayors of Ille-et-Vilaine Association 

Communes of Ille-et-Vilaine